Daniel J. O'Donohue is a retired U.S. Marine lieutenant general. O'Donohue previously served as commanding general of 1st Marine Division and commanding officer of 1st Marine Regiment.

Marine Corps career
O'Donohue graduated from the College of William and Mary and was commissioned in 1984 as a second lieutenant. He graduated from The Basic School at Marine Corps Base Quantico and served as platoon leader in the 2nd Marine Division.

His staff and command assignments include:
 student, Amphibious Warfare School; 
 student, Naval Postgraduate School, Ground Structure Planner, Headquarters Marine Corps (1988-1992); 
 Company Commanding Officer with 1st Battalion, 2nd Marines (1993-1995); 
 Operations Officer, 8th Marine Regiment (1995-1996); 
 Operations Officer, Joint Task Force Assured Response and Special Purpose Marine Air-Ground Task Force Liberia (1996); 
 Tactics Instructor and Program Director, Amphibious Warfare School (1997-2000); 
 Operations Officer, 1st Marine Division (2001-2002);
 student, School of Advanced Warfighting;
 Commanding Officer, 2nd Battalion, 5th Marines (2002-2004);
 Assistant Chief of Staff G-7 / Division Combat Assessment Officer (2004);
 Deputy Branch Head, Secretary of the Defense's Office of Force Transformation (2005-2007);
 Branch Head, Ground Combat Element Branch, Plans, Policies and Operations, Headquarters Marine Corps (2007-2008);
 Assistant Chief of Staff G-3, 1st Marine Division (2008-2009);
 Commanding Officer, 1st Marine Regiment (2009-2010);
 student, National War College;
 Director, Capabilities Development Directorate, Headquarters Marine Corps (2010-2012);
 Deputy Director for Force Management, Joint Staff J-8 (2013), Deputy Chief of Staff for Operations, ISAF Joint Command (2014);
 Commanding General of Marine Corps Forces Cyberspace Command (2015);
 Commanding General, 1st Marine Division (2015-2017);
 Deputy Commandant, Information, Headquarters Marine Corps (2017-2018)
 and Director for Joint Force Development, Joint Staff J-7.

Awards and decorations

References
Notes

Living people
Year of birth missing (living people)
Recipients of the Legion of Merit
United States Marine Corps generals
United States Marine Corps officers
Recipients of the Defense Superior Service Medal